Frances Hogben (born 16 October 1937) is a British former swimmer. She competed in two events at the 1956 Summer Olympics. At the 1958 British Empire and Commonwealth Games, she competed for Scotland.

References

1937 births
Living people
Scottish female swimmers
British female swimmers
Olympic swimmers of Great Britain
Swimmers at the 1956 Summer Olympics
Commonwealth Games competitors for Scotland
Swimmers at the 1958 British Empire and Commonwealth Games
Sportspeople from Portsmouth